Wetherby War Memorial stands on Wetherby Bridge in Wetherby, West Yorkshire.  It was erected as a memorial to those who had fallen in the First World War.  The memorial was designed by Louis Frederick Roslyn.

Memorials
The war memorial commemorates those from Wetherby who were casualties of the First World War.  The inscription upon it reads 'IN HONOUR AND EVERLASTING MEMORY OF THE MEN OF WETHERBY WHO FELL IN THE GREAT WAR 1914-1918'.  There are plaques below with the names of the casualties; the plaques on the front of the memorial listing the names of great war casualties.  Additional plaques were added to either side for the casualties of the Second World War.

Listing
The memorial has been Grade II listed since 1966.

Remembrance Sunday

The Remembrance Sunday parade concludes by the war memorial.  On the morning the Bridge is closed to traffic.  Wreaths are placed at the memorial.

See also
Listed buildings in Wetherby

Notes and references

Citations

Wetherby
World War I memorials in England
Outdoor sculptures in England
Monuments and memorials in Leeds
Buildings and structures completed in 1920
Bronze sculptures in the United Kingdom
Cenotaphs in the United Kingdom
Military history of West Yorkshire